Lepidodactylus euaensis, also known as the Eua scaly-toed gecko or Eua forest gecko, is a species of gecko. It is endemic to ʻEua Island in Tonga.

References

Lepidodactylus
Reptiles described in 1988